Ramin (Ron) Najafi is an Iranian-American businessman and the Founder and CEO of Emery Pharma. He is the Founder and former CEO of NovaBay Pharmaceuticals.

Najafi was born in Tehran, in 1958. He completed his primary education and received his high school diploma from Alborz High School in Tehran. In 1976, he emigrated to the United States to pursue his passion of becoming a chemist. He began his undergraduate degree in pharmacy at the University of Pittsburgh, and earned both a B.S. and M.S. in chemistry under the guidance of Professor John Soderquist at the University of San Francisco. He then received his Ph.D. at UC Davis under the tutelage of Professor (Emeritus) George Zweifel[i]. Post-Ph.D., He worked at Sigma-Aldrich, Rhone Poulenc Rorer (now Sanofi), and PerkinElmer-Applied Biosystems before leaving to found CP Lab Safety and NovaBay Pharmaceuticals.

Najafi is an innate innovator with more than 50 patents and pending patent applications, including a class of non-antibiotic, antimicrobial compounds named Aganocides®. The leading molecule of this aganocide family of compounds, auriclosene, has a broad spectrum of antimicrobial activity against bacteria, viruses and fungi. Auriclosene is chemically stable and has an extremely low probability of developing resistance. NovaBay is developing a formulation of Auriclosene to be used against eye, skin, and urinary tract infections. These products are currently in FDA monitored clinical trials. The products are intended to replace current classical antibiotics used in eye, skin, and urinary tract infections. Ron Najafi championed development of NeutroPhase for wound care.  In September 2013, working together with John Crew, MD (vascular surgeon) they developed Crew-NovaBay minimally invasive surgical procedure to treat flesh eating bacteria.  NeutroPhase has been successfully used in over 40 cases diagnosed as flesh eating infection.  NeutroPhase has shown in a number of critical scientific publications to neutralize the key toxins responsible for the flesh eating disease. In 2014, Ron Najafi and his sister, Kathryn Najafi, MD (Ophthalmologist & Surgeon) discovered a unique formulation of NeutroPhase to help manage patients with Blepharitis.  This unique formulation was initially called i-Lid Cleanser and later changed name to Avenova. Avenova is now the leading product for the management of Blepharitis, MGD and Dry Eye. 
 
Najafi currently heads Emery Pharma located in Alameda, California.

Early life and education
Najafi immigrated to the United States in 1976, before the Iranian Revolution.  At University of San Francisco, he earned a B.S. and M.S. in chemistry in Dr. John Soderquist's laboratory, and then received his Ph.D. at the University of California at Davis under Dr. George Zweifel.  He worked at Sigma-Aldrich, Rhone Poulenc, and PerkinElmer before leaving to found Calpac Labs (now CP Lab Safety), NovaCal Pharmaceuticals (now NovaBay Pharmaceuticals), and Emery Pharma.

Awards and recognition
Najafi is among the U.S. State Department's "List of Prominent Iranian Americans."
Najafi was recognized by PharmaVoice 100 as one of 100 most influential leaders of 2008.  He is a tenacious leader and innovative developer of new molecules recognized for creating a paradigm shift in how antibiotics are used. He is an inventor on more than 50 patents & pending patents applications, including a class of non-antibiotic, antimicrobial compounds named Aganocides.  The lead molecule, Auriclosene  has broad spectrum of activity against bacteria (Wang 2011), viruses (Yoon 2011), and fungi (Ghannoum 2013), is chemically stable (Wang 2008), and has extremely low probability of developing resistance (D'Lima 2012).  Currently, auriclosene is in four clinical trials for treatment of adenoviral conjunctivitis, bacterial conjunctivitis, impetigo and urinary catheter blockage and encrustation (Gottardi 2013).

Career
Emery Pharma, Founder, Chairman & CEO (2015–present)

NovaBay Pharmaceuticals, Inc. – Founder, Chairman, CEO (2000–2015)

CP Lab Safety – Founder, Chairman, CEO (1996–2002)

PerkinElmer-Applied Biosystems – Research Scientist (1993–1996)

Rhone Poulenc Rorer – Research Scientist (1991–1993)

Sigma-Aldrich Corp – Senior Development Chemist (1989–1991)

Publications
Ghannoum MA, Long L, Cirino AJ, Miller AR, Najafi R, Wang L, Sharma K, Anderson M, Memarzadeh B. "Efficacy of NVC-422 in the treatment of dermatophytosis caused by Trichophyton mentagrophytes using a guinea pig model." Int J Dermatol. 2013; 52: 567–71. doi: 10.1111/j.1365-4632.2012.05477.x.

Jekle A, Yoon J, Zuck M, Najafi R, Wang L, Shiau T, Francavilla C, Rani SA, Eitzinger C, Nagl M, Anderson M, Debabov D. "NVC-422 inactivates Staphylococcus aureus toxins." Antimicrob Agents Chemother. 2013 Feb;57(2):924-9. doi: 10.1128/AAC.01945-12.

Crew J, Varilla R, Rocas TA, Debabov D, Wang L, Najafi A, Rani SA, Najafi RR, Anderson M. "NeutroPhase(®) in chronic non-healing wounds." Int J Burns Trauma. 2012;2(3):126-34.

Yoon J, Jekle A, Najafi R, Ruado F, Zuck M, Khosrovi B, Memarzadeh B, Debabov D, Wang L, Anderson M. "Virucidal mechanism of action of NVC-422, a novel antimicrobial drug for the treatment of adenoviral conjunctivitis." Antiviral Res. 2011 Dec;92(3):470-8. doi: 10.1016/j.antiviral.2011.10.009.

Darouiche D, Najafi R, Krantz K, Debabov D, Friedman L, Khosrovi B, Wang L, Iovino S, Anderson M.  "NVC-422: Antiinfective agent, treatment of impetigo, treatment of conjunctivitis, treatment of urinary tract infections." Drugs Fut. 2011;36:651–656.

Low E, Kim B, Francavilla C, Shiau TP, Turtle ED, O'Mahony DJ, Alvarez N, Houchin A, Xu P, Zuck M, Celeri C, Anderson MB, Najafi RR, Jain RK. "Structure stability/activity relationships of sulfone stabilized N,N-dichloroamines." Bioorg Med Chem Lett. 2011; 21(12): 3682–5. doi: 10.1016/j.bmcl.2011.04.084.

Wang L, Belisle B, Bassiri M, Xu P, Debabov D, Celeri C, Alvarez N, Robson MC, Payne WG, Najafi R, Khosrovi B. "Chemical characterization and biological properties of NVC-422, a novel, stable N-chlorotaurine analog." Antimicrob Agents Chemother. 2011 Jun;55(6):2688-92. doi: 10.1128/AAC.00158-11.

Francavilla C, Turtle ED, Kim B, O'Mahony DJ, Shiau TP, Low E, Alvarez NJ, Celeri CE, D'Lima L, Friedman LC, Ruado FS, Xu P, Zuck ME, Anderson MB, Najafi RR, Jain RK. "Novel N-chloroheterocyclic antimicrobials." Bioorg Med Chem Lett. 2011 May 15;21(10):3029-33. doi: 10.1016/j.bmcl.2011.03.035.

Shiau TP, Turtle ED, Francavilla C, Alvarez NJ, Zuck M, Friedman L, O'Mahony DJ, Low E, Anderson MB, Najafi R, Jain RK. "Novel 3-chlorooxazolidin-2-ones as antimicrobial agents." Bioorg Med Chem Lett. 2011 May 15;21(10):3025-8. doi: 10.1016/j.bmcl.2011.03.036.

Francavilla C, Low E, Nair S, Kim B, Shiau TP, Debabov D, Celeri C, Alvarez N, Houchin A, Xu P, Najafi R, Jain R. "Quaternary ammonium N,N-dichloroamines as topical, antimicrobial agents." Bioorg Med Chem Lett. 2009; 19, 2731–2734. doi: 10.1016/j.bmcl.2009.03.120.

Shiau TP, Houchin A, Nair S, Xu P, Low E, Najafi RR, Jain R.  "Stieglitz rearrangement of N,N-dichloro-beta,beta-disubstituted taurines under mild aqueous conditions." Bioorg Med Chem Lett. 2009 Feb 15;19(4):1110-4. doi: 10.1016/j.bmcl.2008.12.109.

Low E, Nair S, Shiau T, Belisle B, Debabov D, Celeri C, Zuck M, Najafi R, Georgopapadakou N, Jain R. "N,N-Dichloroaminosulfonic acids as novel topical antimicrobial agents."  Bioorg Med Chem Lett. 2009;19: 196–198. doi: 10.1016/j.bmcl.2008.10.114.

Wang L, Khosrovi B, Najafi R. "N-Chloro-2,2-dimethyltaurine: a new class of remarkably stable N-chlorotaurines." Tetrahedron Lett. 2008;49:2193–2195. doi:10.1016/j.tetlet.2008.02.038.

Robson MC, Payne WG, Ko F, Mentis M, Donati G, Shafii SM, Culverhouse S, Wang L, Khosrovi B, Najafi R, Cooper DM, Bassiri M.  "Hypochlorous Acid as a Potential Wound Care Agent: Part II. Stabilized Hypochlorous Acid: Its Role in Decreasing Tissue Bacterial Bioburden and Overcoming the Inhibition of Infection on Wound Healing." J Burns Wounds. 2007 Apr 11;6:e6.

Wang L, Bassiri M, Najafi R, Najafi K, Yang J, Khosrovi B, Hwong W, Barati E, Belisle B, Celeri C, Robson MC. "Hypochlorous Acid as a Potential Wound Care Agent Part I. Stabilized Hypochlorous Acid: A component of the Inorganic Armamentarium of Innate Immunity." J Burns Wounds. 2007;6:65–79.

Najafi MR, Wang M-L, Zweifel GS. "(Z)-alpha-(Trimethylsilyl)-alpha,beta-Unsaturated Esters Their Stereoselective Conversion into alpha,beta- and beta,gamma-Unsaturated Esters and beta,gamma-Unsaturated Ketene Acetals." J Org Chem. 1991;56:2468.  doi: 10.1021/jo00007a039.

Zweifel G, Najafi MR, Rajagopalan S. "Hydroboration of Methoxyenynes: A Novel Synthesis of (E)-Methoxyenones"  Tetrahedron Lett 1988;29:1895. doi: 10.1016/S0040-4039(00)82071-7.

Soderquist JA, Najafi MR. "Selective Oxidation of Organoboranes with Anhydrous Trimethylamine-N-Oxide." J Org Chem. 1986;51:1330. doi: 10.1021/jo00358a032.

Zweifel GS, Leung T, Najafi MR, Najdi S. "Stereoselective Syntheses of Alkenyl-Substituted 1,3-Dioxolanes or 4,7-Dihydro-1,3-dioxepins or an (E)-alpha,beta-Unsaturated Aldehyde from (Z)-2-Butene-1,4-diols" J Org Chem. 1985;50:2004. doi: 10.1021/jo00211a053.

References

Links
 NovaBay pharmaceuticals 
 CP LabSafety 
 PerkinElmer
 Rhône-Poulenc
 Sigma-Aldrich

American people of Iranian descent
People from Tehran
University of San Francisco alumni
University of California, Davis alumni